Io was, in Greek mythology, one of the mortal lovers of Zeus. An Argive princess, she was an ancestor of many kings and heroes, such as Perseus, Cadmus, Heracles, Minos, Lynceus, Cepheus, and Danaus. The astronomer Simon Marius named a moon of Jupiter after Io in 1614.

Because her brother was Phoroneus, Io is also known as Phoronis (an adjective form of Phoroneus: "Phoronean"). She was sometimes compared to the egyptian goddess Isis, whereas her Egyptian husband Telegonus was "Osiris".

Family 
In most versions of the legend, Io was the daughter of Inachus, though various other purported genealogies are also known. If her father was Inachus, then her mother would presumably have been Inachus' wife (and sister), the Oceanid nymph Melia, daughter of Oceanus, although this is nowhere stated. The 2nd century AD geographer Pausanias also suggests that she is the daughter of Inachus and retells the story of Zeus falling in love with Io, the legendary wrath of Hera, and the metamorphosis by which Io becomes a beautiful white heifer. At another instant several generations later, Pausanias recounts another Io, descendant of Phoroneus, daughter of Iasus, who himself was the son of Argus and Ismene, the daughter of Asopus, or of Triopas and Sosis; Io's mother in the latter case was Leucane. Io's father was called Peiren in the Catalogue of Women, and by Acusilaus, possibly a son of the elder Argus, also known as Peiras, Peiranthus or Peirasus. Io may therefore be identical to Callithyia, daughter of Peiranthus, as is suggested by Hesychius of Alexandria.

Mythology

Io and Zeus 
Io was a priestess of the Goddess Hera in Argos, whose cult her father Inachus was supposed to have introduced to Argos. Zeus noticed Io, a mortal woman, and lusted after her. In the version of the myth told in Prometheus Bound she initially rejected Zeus' advances, until her father threw her out of his house on the advice of oracles. According to some stories, Zeus then turned Io into a heifer in order to hide her from his wife; others maintain that Hera herself transformed Io.

In the version of the story in which Zeus transformed Io, the deception failed, and Hera begged Zeus to give her the heifer as a present, which, having no reason to refuse, he did. Pitying the unfortunate girl, Gaia, the goddess of the earth, created the violet, so the cow could eat, thus growing "from her from whom it has its name", based on incorrect folk etymology. The various colours of the violet (red, purple, white) changed on account of Io's life, red for the blushing maiden, purple for the cow, white for the stars. Hera then sent Argus Panoptes, a giant who had 100 eyes, to watch Io and prevent Zeus from visiting her, and so Zeus sent Hermes to distract and eventually slay Argus. According to Ovid, he did so by first lulling him to sleep by playing the panpipes and telling stories.  Zeus freed Io, still in the form of a heifer. In some myths, Hera uses Argus' eyes to decorate her peacock's feathers to thank the giant for his help.

In order to exact her revenge, Hera sent a gadfly to sting Io continuously, driving her to wander the world without rest. Io eventually crossed the path between the Propontis and the Black Sea, which thus acquired the name Bosporus (meaning ox passage), where she met Prometheus, who had been chained on Mt. Caucasus by Zeus. Prometheus comforted Io with the information that she would be restored to human form and become the ancestress of the greatest of all heroes, Heracles (Hercules). Io escaped across the Ionian Sea to Egypt, where she was restored to human form by Zeus. There, she gave birth to Zeus's son Epaphus, and a daughter as well, Keroessa. She later married Egyptian king Telegonus. Their grandson, Danaus, eventually returned to Greece with his fifty daughters (the Danaids), as recalled in Aeschylus' play The Suppliants.

The myth of Io must have been well known to Homer, who often calls Hermes Argeiphontes, which is often translated as "Argus-slayer", though this interpretation is disputed by Robert Beekes. Walter Burkert notes that the story of Io was told in the ancient epic tradition at least four times of which we have traces: in the Danais, in the Phoronis—Phoroneus founded the cult of Hera, according to Hyginus' Fabulae 274 and 143—in a fragment of the Hesiodic Aigimios, as well as in similarly fragmentary Hesiodic Catalogue of Women. A mourning commemoration of Io was observed at the Heraion of Argos into classical times.

The ancients connected Io with the Moon, and in Aeschylus' Prometheus Bound, where Io encounters Prometheus, she refers to herself as "the horned virgin". From her relationship with Phoroneus, as sister (or descendant), Io is sometimes called Phoronis.

Io at some point landed at Damalis, and the Chalcedonians erected a bronze cow on the spot.

Io as Isis 

Lygdus and his wife, Telethusa, were a poor couple living in Crete. When Telethusa became pregnant, her husband told her that they can't afford having a daughter, and that they have no other option than to kill the child if it would be a daughter. 8 months later Io, later in the story mentioned as Isis, came in a vision to Telethusa telling her that she should keep her daughter when it's born and must tell her husband that it's a boy named Iphis.

Later in the story, Isis (Io) changes Iphis' sex when she is supposed to marry her fiancée, Ianthe.

Gallery

Notes

References
 Aeschylus, Suppliants in Persians. Seven against Thebes. Suppliants. Prometheus Bound, edited and translated by Alan H. Sommerstein, Loeb Classical Library No. 145, Cambridge, Massachusetts, Harvard University Press, 2009. . Online version at Harvard University Press.
 
 
 Apollodorus, Apollodorus, The Library, with an English Translation by Sir James George Frazer, F.B.A., F.R.S. in 2 Volumes. Cambridge, Massachusetts, Harvard University Press; London, William Heinemann Ltd. 1921. . Online version at the Perseus Digital Library.
 Ovid. Metamorphoses, Volume I: Books 1-8. Translated by Frank Justus Miller. Revised by G. P. Goold. Loeb Classical Library No. 42. Cambridge, Massachusetts: Harvard University Press, 1916. Online version at Harvard University Press.
 Peck, William Thane (editor), The First and Second Books of Ovid's Metamorphoses, Ginn & Company, 1900.
 Tsagalis, Christos, Early Greek Epic Fragments I: Antiquarian and Genealogical Epic, Walter de Gruyter GmbH & Co KG, 2017.

External links

 Theoi.com: Io: naiad nymph of Argolis and Egypt  Assembles the essential references in Greek and Latin literature, in translation.
 Io engravings by Goltzius from the De Verda collection
 Warburg Institute Iconographic Database (ca 250 images of Io and Argus) 

Greek mythological priestesses
Mortal women of Zeus
Mythological bovines
Children of Inachus
Metamorphoses characters
Metamorphoses into animals in Greek mythology
Isis
Argive characters in Greek mythology
Egyptian characters in Greek mythology
Egypt in Greek mythology
Deeds of Hera
Deeds of Hermes
Metamorphoses into flowers in Greek mythology
Deeds of Gaia